The 2019 WAFF Women's Clubs Championship was the inaugural WAFF Women's Clubs Championship, the West Asian women's club football championship organised by the WAFF. It took place in Aqaba, Jordan, from 3 to 11 October 2019 as a single round-robin.

Teams
Five teams from five nations participated in the inaugural competition.

Group stage 
All times are local, AST (UTC+3).

Goalscorers

See also
 2019 AFC Women's Club Championship

External links

References

 
WAFF Women's Clubs Championship
2019 in women's association football
WAFF